Saga is a 1980 board game published by TSR.

Gameplay
Saga is a game in which Viking heroes are scrounging throughout northern Europe looking for glory, but slaughtering trolls, giants, evil elves, ghosts, witches, dragons, warriors and other heroes.

Reception
W. G. Armintrout reviewed Saga in The Space Gamer No. 46. Armintrout commented that "As an introductory game, Saga is very good. People who play Sorry won't be intimidated by it. It is a poor game if you play for competition rather than for fun - luck is too important. Otherwise, it is an average beer-and-pretzels games."

References

Board games introduced in 1980
TSR, Inc. games